Porin Ässät (Finnish for Pori Aces) is an ice hockey team based in Pori, Satakunta, Finland. They have had a women's reprecentative team in 1982–95 and 1999–2003.

Porin Ässät was formed in 1967 but women's hockey was introduced to the club in 1982. Ässät was one of the ten founders of the Naisten SM-sarja (now Naisten Liiga). Ässät folded in 2004, but in 2020 it re-started as an ice hockey school for women with the name Ässät Gold Stars.

History

In the SM-sarja (1982–1995)

1982–83 
Ässät Hockey's women's team was established in 1982 and it was one of the 10 founders Naisten SM-sarja.

Ässät was tied with Tiikerit at 2nd in the Group A. Ässät played a match against Tiikerit wich would decide who makes it to the playoffs. Tiikerit beat Ässät 7-6 and thus Ässät did not make the playoffs. Ässät played Anne Bäckman led the league with 42 points in 7 games played.

1990–91 
Ässät finished 4th in the regular season. Ässät lost to EKS in the bronze medal game.

1994–95 
Ässät finished 7th in the regular season and was relegated to the I-divisioona. After that the team took a break and returned in 1999.

In the I-divisioona and II-divisioona (1999–2003)

First season in I-divisioona and SM-sarja qualification attempt 
Ässät finished 4th in the I-divisioona regular season and got to play for the Naisten SM-sarja qualification series (Karsintasarja in Finnish). Ässät finished 6th in the eight-team qualification series and thus did not get promoted back to the SM-sarja.

Last seasons and disestablishment (2000–2003) 
Ässät played in I-divisioona for 2000–01 and 2002–03. It played in the II-divisioona in 2001–02.

Ässät's women's reprecentative team was disbanded at the end of the 2002–03 season.

The brightest star and statistically the best player on the Ässät Women team was Sari Fisk.

Establishment of the Ässät Gold Stars (2020–present) 
Ässät has had a hockey school for women called Ässät Gold Stars since 2020. In the junior departement, Ässät has a girl skating school and a team for U10 girls called Ässät Red Stars.

Arguably the best female player to come out of the Ässät junior department after the collapse of the senior team is Sofianna Sundelin, Olympic and World Championship bronze medallist who currently plays for Team Kuortane in the Naisten Liiga.

Notable alumni 

  Sari Marjamäki (née Fisk) (four-time European champion and six-time World Championship bronze medallist)
  Sofianna Sundelin (Olympic bronze medallist and a World Championship bronze medallist)
  Anne Haanpää (née Bäckman) (4-time European champion)
  Sanna Kanerva (1995 European champion)
  Sanna Sainio (top-three point scorer for Ässät)
  Tatyana Tsaryova (first-time World Championship bronze medallist)

International players 
 Lena Kofod 1999-2000
 Violetta Simanova 1999-2000
 Tatjana Tikhonov 1999-2000
 Sandra Toon 1999-2000
 Tatyana Tsaryova 1999-2000

1999–00 I-divisioona & SM-sarja qualification roster 

|}

Franchise records 

These are the top-five-point-scorers in franchise history. Figures are updated after each completed Liiga season.
  – current Ässät player
Note: Pos = Position; GP = Games Played; G = Goals; A = Assists; Pts = Points

Honours

Awards named after Ässät players 
Sari Fisk Award, named after Sari Fisk

Awards won by players 
Marianne Ihalainen Award (1): Anne Haanpää, 1982–83 - 
Tiia Reima Award (1): Anne Haanpää, 1982–83 - Sari Marjamäki, 1992–93 -

Logo history

Notes

References 

Ässät
Ice hockey teams in Finland
Ice hockey clubs established in 1982
Ice hockey clubs established in 2020
Sport in Pori
Sport in Satakunta